This was a new event to the ITF Women's Circuit in 2015.

Nao Hibino won the title, defeating An-Sophie Mestach in the final, 6–1, 7–6(8–6).

Seeds

Main draw

Finals

Top half

Bottom half

References 
 Main draw

Stockton Challenger - Singles